Oktyabrsk is a rural locality (a village) in Alegazovsky Selsoviet, Mechetlinsky District, Bashkortostan, Russia. The population was 394 as of 2010. There are 9 streets.

Geography 
Oktyabrsk is located 26 km southwest of Bolsheustyikinskoye (the district's administrative centre) by road. Voznesenka is the nearest rural locality.

References 

Rural localities in Mechetlinsky District